In enzymology, a glycochenodeoxycholate sulfotransferase is an enzyme that catalyzes the chemical reaction

3'-phosphoadenylyl sulfate + glycochenodeoxycholate  adenosine 3',5'-bisphosphate + glycochenodeoxycholate 7-sulfate

Thus, the two substrates of this enzyme are 3'-phosphoadenylyl sulfate and glycochenodeoxycholate, whereas its two products are adenosine 3',5'-bisphosphate and glycochenodeoxycholate 7-sulfate.

Nomenclature 

This enzyme belongs to the family of transferases, specifically the sulfotransferases, which transfer sulfur-containing groups.  The systematic name of this enzyme class is 3'-phosphoadenylyl-sulfate:glycochenodeoxycholate 7-sulfotransferase. Other names in common use include bile acid:3'-phosphoadenosine-5'-phosphosulfate sulfotransferase, bile acid:PAPS:sulfotransferase, and BAST.

References

Further reading 

 
 

EC 2.8.2
Enzymes of unknown structure